Vish Dhamija is a British Indian crime-fiction writer. According to the Indian Press he is India's Best Page-Turner and one of the ten most popular Indian thriller authors. He is the only writer of Indian origin listed among the major legal thriller authors of the world. He is also known for his psychological thrillers. In August 2015, at the release of his first legal fiction (his third novel) Déjà Karma, Glimpse Magazine called him India's John Grisham  for stimulating the genre of legal fiction in India which was almost non-existent before his arrival on the scene. In a  survey by eBooks India website, Vish Dhamija was listed along the top 51 Indian authors you must follow. The Asian Age and The Times of India have cited him as the only legal fiction writer in India.

Early life 

Dhamija grew up in Ajmer, Rajasthan, where he spent the first twenty years of his life. He attended St. Anselm's School, a convent school in Ajmer. He earned his B. Com from Government College, Ajmer. Dhamija dropped out of law school after his first year, and then attended Jodhpur University for a degree in Management. After a few years of working in the corporate world in India, he left for Manchester Business School in the UK for an MBA in Marketing and Strategy.

In school, Dhamija was very active in literary and stage activities. He was the President of the school's Literary Society.

Writing career 

Dhamija's first book, Nothing Lasts Forever, a crime thriller was published in 2010 by Srishti Publishers; it was long-listed for "Vodafone-Crossword Book Award 2011.".

Bhendi Bazaar, Dhamija's second book, was published in 2014 by Rumour Books, and tells the story of a serial killer and the police officer who attempts to identify the pattern behind the killer's murders before she becomes the next victim. The book spent over a year in India's Top 100 list for 'Crime, Thriller, and Mystery', and has been noted for its ingenious plot and rich characters.

Dhamija has said in interviews that crime fiction, which is mainly what he reads, is the only genre in which he can imagine himself writing for the time being. 
 
In August 2015, Déjà Karma (Dhamija's third book and first legal and psychological thriller) became a bestseller and was featured on both The Financial Express and Crossword Bookstores lists for two consecutive weeks.  His next book, Doosra – The Other One was released in Feb 2016, and Business Standard featured it in March, calling it a "…must read.". Dhamija's fifth book - Nothing Else Matters was launched at the Kumaon Literary Festival in October. In November it reached number 6 on WH Smith charts on both, domestic and international airports in New Delhi. Bloggers rated it as one of the top 10 books by Indian authors in 2016  and top 10 romance novels of 2016 by Iindian authors. Harper Collins India released Dhamija's sixth book, Unlawful Justice in June 2017, which The Times of India called: "a gripping legal thriller". Unlawful Justice was recognized by Amazon India as one of the Memorable Books of 2017, and The Asian Age included it in its annual listing of the Best Books of 2017.

Dhamija's seventh book (his third legal fiction), The Mogul was released in July 2018 by Harper Collins. "Gripping", said The Times of India. The Indian Express, in its review, called out that "Dhamija has set the sky as the limit, figuratively and literally." The Telegraph praised, The Heist Artist (Dhamija's eighth book, a crime caper) saying: “It’s difficult to find a single dull moment in this book...”. The Heist Artist was the only Indian author/publication to be included in The Times of India list of "Crime fiction and thrillers you should read in 2019" and is listed as one of the eight crime fiction novels that other crime writers must read.

In June 2019, Abundantia Entertainment announced that it had acquired the rights to Dhamija's much sought-after "Rita Ferreira" series (Bhendi Bazaar, Doosra & Lipstick) to adapt the books into a multi-season, premium original digital series.

Dhamija's second psychological thriller, Prisoner's Dilemma, was published by Pan Macmillan in April 2021. It had a slow start due to Covid-19, but it has been on the WH Smith charts (at airport) even a year after launch.

Cold Justice, Dhamija's fourth legal thriller, released on July 4th, 2022 and The Times of India called it: "A gripping, heart-stopping novel… a must-read recommendation for thriller lovers."

Personal life 

Dhamija worked in marketing and retailing for almost two decades for global brands like Ford, Kodak and United Colors of Benetton. He is now a public speaker, and runs a nursery school. He is married to Nidhi Singh, the great-granddaughter of Raja Mahendra Pratap. Vish spends his time between London and The Isle of Thanet, and in India.

Bibliography

See also 
 List of Indian writers

References

Living people
British crime fiction writers
Alumni of the Manchester Business School
Year of birth missing (living people)